Zero Carbon World is a charity registered in England and Wales. It is also a Limited liability company.

Objectives
The objectives of the charity are:
 To implement carbon reduction projects
 To challenge the misconceptions surrounding carbon reduction amongst individuals and organizations
 To encourage greater adoption of sustainable solutions

Electric vehicle chargers
One way that Zero Carbon World aims to meet its objectives is the donation of Electric Vehicle Charging stations to various organisations around the UK. Sites that install donated chargers get added to the charity's ZeroNet EV charger map.

Sponsorship
Zero Carbon World were one of the Sponsors of the 2012 Bath Film Festival which included a showing of Revenge of the Electric Car.

References

Carbon emissions in the European Union
Electric vehicle organizations
Environmental charities based in the United Kingdom
Greenhouse gases